Julian Ripoli (born 7 October 1992) is a former French born Italian professional footballer who played as a midfielder.

Biography
Born in Paris, Ripoli began playing football for the youth sides of Co Vincennes and US Torcy, both in the suburbs of Paris. He later moved to Switzerland playing in the youth sides for Neuchâtel Xamax, before joining Genoa in Italy. Ripoli’s first professional contract came in 2013 when he joined Polish side Lechia Gdańsk, initially joining the Lechia Gdańsk II team. For the remainder of the 2012–13 season he played nine times for the Lechia II team and featured in the Młoda Ekstraklasa (under 21’s). At the end of his season his contract with Lechia was not renewed. For the 2013–14 season he moved to Romania to play with Universitatea Craiova, playing five times in the league that season as the team won the Romanian Liga II. After his time in Romania he moved back to Italy, joining Terracina Calcio 1925 for a season before a short spell with ASD Battipagliese. After failing to consistently play for either team he retired from professional football in 2015.

In 2017 Ripoli created and is the owner of OLO Records, being based in Paris. Ripoli has created his own music with his brother under the name “Miroloja”.

Honours
Universitatea Craiova
Liga II: 2013–14

References

External links
 

Living people
1992 births
Italian footballers
Association football midfielders
US Torcy players
Neuchâtel Xamax FCS players
Lechia Gdańsk players
CS Universitatea Craiova players